Events in the year 1871 in Japan.

Incumbents
Monarch: Emperor Meiji

Governors
Aomori Prefecture: Hiromichi Noda (September 7-November 5), J. Hishida (starting November 7)
Fukui Prefecture: Kotobuki Murata
Fukushima Prefecture: Tomoharu Kiyooka
Gifu Prefecture: Joren Hasegawa
Gunma Prefecture: Sada Aoyama
Hiroshima Prefecture: Kono Toshikama (August 15-November 15), Senbon Hisanobu (November 15-November 27), Kono Toshikama (November 27-December 26), Date Muneoki (starting December 26)
Ibaraki Prefecture:
 July 13-December 9: Tesshu Yamaoka
 starting December 9: Yamaguchi (starting November 2)
Iwate Prefecture: Korekiyo Shima (starting November 2)
Kagawa Prefecture: Mohei Hayashi (starting November 15)
Kochi Prefecture: Yuzo Hayashi (starting November 15)
Kyoto Prefecture: Nobuatsu
Nagano Prefecture: Takaishi Wado (until 1871), Tachiki Kenzen (starting November 20)
Niigata Prefecture: Hirimatsu (starting November 20)
Oita Prefecture: Kei Morishita (starting November 14)
Osaka Prefecture: Yotsutsuji Nishi
Saga Prefecture: Sadao Koga (starting November 14)
Saitama Prefecture: Morihide Nomura (starting November 13)
Shiname Prefecture: Masami Terada (starting November 14)
Tochigi Prefecture: Miki Nabeshima (starting November 13)
Tokyo: Osamu Mibo (until September 7), Yuri Kousei (starting September 7)
Toyama Prefecture: 
 until August: Earl Maeda
 August-December: Obata Nobutomo 
Yamagata Prefecture: ......

Events
January 28 - Japan's first Japanese-language daily newspaper, the Yokohama Mainichi Shinbun, is printed in Yokohama. (Traditional Japanese Date: Eighth Day of the Twelfth Month, 1870)
The Yen was introduced on June 27

References

 
1870s in Japan
Japan
Years of the 19th century in Japan